Florian Müller (born 30 December 1986) is a German former footballer who played as a midfielder.

Honours
 Fritz-Walter-Medal 2005 in Gold (Category U19)

References

External links
 

1986 births
Living people
Sportspeople from Eisenhüttenstadt
Association football midfielders
Footballers from Brandenburg
German footballers
Germany youth international footballers
1. FC Union Berlin players
FC Bayern Munich II players
1. FC Magdeburg players
Alemannia Aachen players
2. Bundesliga players
3. Liga players